The 1936 Miami Redskins football team was an American football team that represented Miami University as a member of the Buckeye Athletic Association (BAA) during the 1936 college football season. In its fifth season under head coach Frank Wilton, Miami compiled a 7–1–1 record (3–1–1 against conference opponents) and tied with Ohio for the BAA championship.

Schedule

References

Miami
Miami RedHawks football seasons
Miami Redskins football